Mario Almada may refer to:

Mario Almada (actor) (1922–2016), Mexican actor
Mario Almada (field hockey) (born 1975), Argentine hockey player